

Highest Grossing Films

Released Films

References

External links
 Bollywood films of 1993 at the Internet Movie Database
 Indian Film Songs from the Year 1993 - A look back at the year 1993 with a special focus on the Hindi film song

1993
Lists of 1993 films by country or language
 Bollywood
1993 in Indian cinema